Laman Ama (English: A Vengeance Story) is a 2018 Indian Meitei language film directed by Sanad Aribam and produced by Rajeshwar Aribam, under the banner of Fast Forward Films. It stars Raju Nong, Saroja Devi Chongtham and Hemlet in the lead roles. It is a Manipuri thriller film. It is adapted from Randy Oliver's Angle of Deflection. The film was released at Manipur State Film Development Corporation (MSFDS), Imphal on 14 October 2018. The movie was selected in the 11th International Guwahati Film Festival 2018.

The blessing ceremony was held at Khagempalli Huidrom Leikai on 3 October 2015.

Synopsis
A single mother with a shady past rises against all odds to avenge her daughter.

Cast
 Raju Nong (Adhikarimayum Raju) as Thouba
 Saroja Devi Chongtham as Ngambi
 Hemlet as Pabung
 Sky Anoubam
 Paul Haokip
 Dhumga Kshetrimayum as Kanhai
 Jotin

Accolades
Saroja Devi Chongtham won the Best Actor in a Leading Role - Female award at the 12th Manipur State Film Awards 2019.

Soundtrack
Denson Salam and Karnajit composed the soundtrack for the film and Kenedy Khuman and Irengbam Thawan wrote the lyrics. The songs are titled Minambani and Aroobana Mataida. The stop motion technique is used to create the video for the song Minambani. The mixing and mastering is done by Bibid Sh. The song was recorded at MS Recording.

Reception 
Chitra Ahanthem of Imphal Free Press opined that "Laman Ama is definitely a film worth watching".

References

2010s Meitei-language films
2018 films